Chandanathoppe railway station (Code:CTPE) or Chandanattop railway station is an 'F-class' halt railway station situated at Kollam–Sengottai branch line of Southern Railway zone, India. It is one among the 25 railway stations in Kollam district. The station is partially serving the city of Quilon. Chandanathoppe railway station is coming under the Madurai railway division of the Southern Railway zone, Indian Railways. The nearest major rail head of Chandanathoppe railway station is Kollam Junction railway station.

Indian Railways is connecting Chandanathoppe with various cities in India like Kollam, Thiruvananthapuram, Tirunelveli, Madurai & with various towns like Paravur, Punalur, Kottarakkara, Nagercoil, Varkala & Neyyattinkara. All the Kollam––Kollam passenger services and Punalur–Madurai–Punalur service have halts at Chandanathoppe

Significance
Chandanattop railway station is situated at the borders of Kollam city. Chandanathoppe is one among the cashew hubs of Kollam city. It is the nearest railway station to Govt. ITI, Chandanathope. People from areas like Mammoodu, Mekone, Kuzhiyam, a portion of Kilikollur etc. are depending on this railway station.

Kilikollur station is situated 1.7 km away from Chandanattop, it is the shortest distance between two railway stations in India.

The station was inaugurated as a halt station in 1989–90 by then Member of parliament from Kollam (Lok Sabha constituency) Shri. S. Krishna Kumar following demand from students of  Govt. ITI, Chandanathope. The old station building having ticket counter was abandoned following gauge conversion in 2007–2010 period.

Services

See also
 Kollam Junction railway station
 Paravur railway station
 Kundara railway station
 Kilikollur railway station

References

External links

Chandanattop
Chandanattop
Madurai railway division
1904 establishments in India
Railway stations opened in 1904